The NASCAR Pinty's Series, commonly abbreviated as NPS, is a national NASCAR racing series in Canada, and is a continuation of the old CASCAR Super Series which was founded in 1981.

History
In September 2006 NASCAR purchased the CASCAR Super Series, the top Canadian stock-car racing series at the time. At the same time, they established a sponsorship agreement with Canadian Tire as the title sponsor. They also signed a television contract with TSN to carry all events with select races being aired live.
Three of the series races, Edmonton, Toronto and Montreal, had crowds in excess of 50,000 fans.

The 2007 season was the inaugural season for the series with the first event being held on May 26, 2007, at Cayuga Motor Speedway with Don Thomson Jr. winning in a spirited battle. Andrew Ranger, in his first year of stock-car competition, won the second race, at Mosport International Raceway. He took over the lead in the points standings after that event and never relinquished it on his way to the first championship. The first season saw five races decided on last-lap passes.The 2008 season featured Scott Steckly who dominated many events. He won three of the first four events of the year and held the lead in the driver championship point standings all season long. He set a series record with four victories throughout the year.

The third season had Andrew Ranger taking centre stage by winning his second series championship in three seasons. He completed his transition from the open-wheel racing world by incorporating his road courses experience with a strong performances on the oval tracks. During the season, he won a single-season series record six races—three on road courses and three on ovals.

The 2010 season belonged to D. J. Kennington. He won his first series title on the power of five wins, nine top-fives and eleven top-10 finishes. Kennington battled J. R. Fitzpatrick for the points lead all season as the two exchanged the top spot an unprecedented five times. Kennington also finished second to fellow Pinty's Series competitor Jason Bowles in the Toyota All-Star Showdown.

In 2011, Steckly had a strong season where he won three events and finished in the runner-up position four times on his way to capture his second championship over Kennington, who had a pair of wins. Long-time road racer Robin Buck and rookie Peter Shepherd  won their first events. Ranger won the two biggest events of the year in dominant fashion at Montreal and Toronto. Former champion Don Thomson Jr. retired after a lengthy career.

In 2012, Kennington won a record seven events, including five consecutively, during the summer. Kennington won his second championship in three years. He faced competition from runners-up J. R. Fitzpatrick and Ranger who both won two events.

On February 17, 2015, Canadian Tire did not renew their sponsorship of the series after the 2015 season. On December 7, NASCAR and Pinty's Delicious Foods Inc. signed a six-year agreement to sponsor the series beginning with the 2016 season.

The 2018 Pinty's Series also included its first race in the United States, at New Hampshire Motor Speedway, replacing the Monster Energy NASCAR Cup Series on their fall race weekend that continues to feature the NASCAR K&N Pro Series East and the NASCAR Whelen Modified Tour, now the featured division with the Musket 250.

For the 2019 season Continental AG replaced Goodyear as exclusive tire supplier for the series with their General Tire branding. Also it was announced that all races would be live in the United States through fanschoice.tv and six races live through TSN in Canada.
In December 2019, NASCAR changed their schedule. The series would be returning to two previous tracks - Sunset Speedway and Circuit ICAR. The series was also set to produce their first-ever dirt race at Ohsweken Speedway in August 2020. Rescheduled for August 2022.

Because of the Covid-19 Pandemic, a shortened 2020 season was completed that consisted of six races at three tracks. Sunset Speedway, Flamboro Speedway and Jukasa Motor Speedway played host to three double race weekends that made up the entire season. The championship would also be renamed to the Pintys Fan Cave Challenge.

Diversity

The NASCAR Pinty's Series contains drivers with many different agendas and backgrounds. Veteran Canadian drivers compete in the series on a part-time basis for fun while maintaining full-time careers, while others are serious championship contenders. In recent years, a NASCAR regional series driver from the United States will often run in the races to gain experience and with NASCAR's specification engine rule. Drivers include Cale Gale, Jason Bowles, Timmy Hill, Tony Stewart, Dave Blaney and Austin Dillon. Drivers with open-wheel and road racing backgrounds have also attempted races, including, Jacques Villeneuve, Max Papis, Alex Tagliani, Jean-François Dumoulin and Patrick Carpentier. Even former National Hockey League player Patrice Brisebois runs in the major events which now feature over 40 cars.

In 2011, at Circuit Gilles Villeneuve, a record three female drivers, Maryeve Dufault, Caitlin Johnston and Isabelle Tremblay, attempted the event.

The series is a development, or feeder, series for NASCAR's top national touring divisions. Drivers like Fitzpatrick, Kennington, Ranger, Steckly and Thomson Jr. have competed in the Xfinity Series, while Pierre Bourque and Derek White have raced in the Camping World Truck Series. Ranger finished third in the 2009 NASCAR Nationwide Series event in Montreal after battling with eventual race winner Carl Edwards for much of the race. He competed in the 2011 Sprint Cup Series event at Watkins Glen for FAS Lane Racing finishing 35th after suffering from transmission failure.

On June 2, 2019, Julia Landauer became the first woman in NASCAR Canada history to lead a lap when she led lap 72 of the APC 200 at Jukasa Motor Speedway.

On Augest 15 2022, Aaron Turkey 
"#99" became the first indigenous person to win in the First ever NASCAR Event on Dirt. (The Pinty's 100 - Quick Wick Hot Lap Winner) at Ohsweken Speedway in Six Nations.

Tracks

The following are the tracks which have been, and are currently used in the NASCAR Pinty's Series:

Cars
A gradual implementation of both competition and safety-based modifications have been made to the cars used in the CASCAR Super Series. These include a move to a Goodyear 9.5" tires, the same size that is used in all NASCAR stock-car series, on-dash electrical and ignition systems, in-car fire-suppression equipment and increased fuel cell protection. In 2009, the option of utilizing the NASCAR spec engine program was introduced. The cars use steel tube-framed silhouette stock cars powered by carbureted V8 engines. The cars have a relatively high minimum weight, so development of lightweight components is minimal. A number of components are specified by the rules, as parity is given priority over vehicle development. Manufacturer involvement is therefore limited largely to supply arrangements for long-developed crate motors, and branding on the largely standard bodywork.

Specifications
Power: 
Weight: 
Height: 
Length: 
Wheelbase: 
Width:

Manufacturer representation
Types of cars used include the Ford Fusion, Chevrolet Camaro, and Dodge Challenger. The NASCAR Pinty's Series is the only NASCAR series in which Dodge still provides factory support, as the series is supported by the Canadian arm of Fiat Automobili, S.p.A., having pulled out of the United States and Mexican series after 2012, and is also the only series Toyota does not participate in; it was also the last NASCAR series which had factory support from Pontiac prior to going out of business in 2010 after General Motors's Chapter 11 bankruptcy.

Fiat Chrysler Automobiles 
Dodge Avenger: 2007–2010
Dodge Charger: 2007–2010
Dodge Challenger: 2011–present

Ford Motor Company
Ford Fusion: 2007–present
Ford Mustang: 2022–present

General Motors
Chevrolet Monte Carlo SS: 2007–2009
Pontiac: 2007–2009
Chevrolet Impala: 2009–2017
Chevrolet Camaro: 2018–present

List of series champions
Scott Steckly has the most Pinty's Series championships with four by winning in 2008, 2011, 2013, and 2015.

All-time wins
All-time wins under the NASCAR banner, starting at 2007 season. Does not include CASCAR SuperSeries wins. As of the Motomaster 125 at Jukasa Motor Speedway (September 12, 2020)

References

External links

 
 TSN: Television coverage of the series in Canada
Racing Reference

 
2006 establishments in Canada
Auto racing series in Canada
Stock car racing series
Pinty